The phrase Evangelion movie could refer to any one of these films:
 Neon Genesis Evangelion: Death & Rebirth, the first of two animated feature films that serve as the conclusion to the Neon Genesis Evangelion anime series.
 The End of Evangelion, the second of two animated films that serve as the conclusion to the Neon Genesis Evangelion anime series.
 Rebuild of Evangelion, any of four animated feature films retelling the Neon Genesis Evangelion series and the DaR/EoE movie duology.
 Evangelion: 1.0 You Are (Not) Alone, its remastered version is Evangelion: 1.11
 Evangelion: 2.0 You Can (Not) Advance, its director's cut version is Evangelion: 2.22 
 Evangelion: 3.0 You Can (Not) Redo, as the trend followed, Evangelion: 3.33 released on Feb. 2, 2016 
 Evangelion: 3.0+1.0 Thrice Upon a Time, the final movie in the saga

See also
 Evangelion (disambiguation)